Heckmann is a surname. Notable people with the surname include:

 Alfred Heckmann (1914–1993), Luftwaffe flying ace of World War II
Bradlee Heckmann, American Biologist
 Friedrich Heckmann (born 1941), director of the research institute European forum for migration studies
 Gustav Heckmann (1898–1996), German educator and philosopher
 Otto Heckmann (1901–1983), German astronomer
 Wilhelm Heckmann (1897–1995), German concert and easy listening musician
 Wolf Heckmann (1929–2006), German journalist